Daniel Cristian Lung (born 3 Oct 1987) is a Romanian professional footballer who plays as a centre back for Metaloglobus București.

References

External links
 
 

1987 births
Living people
Sportspeople from Satu Mare
Romanian footballers
Association football defenders
Liga I players
Liga II players
FC Olimpia Satu Mare players
FC Sportul Studențesc București players
FC Rapid București players
CS Concordia Chiajna players
LPS HD Clinceni players
FC Brașov (1936) players
ACS Foresta Suceava players
CS Pandurii Târgu Jiu players
ACS Viitorul Târgu Jiu players
FC Metaloglobus București players